Persuasions of the Witches' Craft: Ritual Magic in Contemporary England is a study of several Wiccan and ceremonial magic groups that assembled in southern England during the 1980s. It was written by the American anthropologist Tanya M. Luhrmann (1959–) of the University of California, San Diego, and first published in 1989.

The work would be criticized by later academics working in the field of Pagan studies and western esotericism, who charged it with dealing with those it was studying in a derogatory manner.

Influence
Writing in her paper within James R. Lewis' edited Magical Religion and Modern Witchcraft anthology, Siân Reid described Luhrmann's work as "a solid ethnography". Nevertheless, she felt that the study "occasionally rings hollow" because Luhrmann failed to take into account the "subjective motivations for magical practice".
In her anthropological study of the U.S. Pagan community, Witching Culture (2004), the American academic Sabina Magliocco noted that her work both built upon and departed from Luhrmann's.

References

Footnotes

Bibliography

 
 
 
 
 
 
 

1989 books
Anthropology books
Religious studies books
Pagan studies books
1980s in modern paganism